Videgha Mathava ( Sanskrit : विदेघ माथव  Maithili : विदेह माधव ) was the founder King of Videha Kingdom in the ancient Indian Subcontinent. Videha is the ancient name of Mithila. Videgha Mathava was previously living on the bank of the holy river Sarswati with his philosophical teacher Rahughuna Gautama. According to Shatapatha Brahmana, Videgha Mathava came to the Mithila region with his teacher and established the Kingdom of Videha.

Etymology 
Videgha Mathava is made of two Sanskrit words Videgha and Mathava. According to the commentary of Sayana, Mathava was the name of a son from the King Mathu from Videgha. Similarly  Gautama was a son from the Rishi Rahugana. According to some books Mathava is also written as Madhava. It is believed that the name of the kingdom came to be known as Videha after the tribal name Videgha of Mathava.

Story of Videgha Mathava 
The story of Videgha Mathava is narrated in Yajurveda. According to Shatapatha Brahmana, Videgha Mathava migrated from the Sarasvati river in Punjab to the middle Ganga valley. He  travelled towards east with Agni ( fire ) but stopped at the river Sadanira (Gandak). Then Videgha Mathava asked to Lord Agni that where he abided now. Lord Agni then said that your abode was at the east of the river Sadanira. It is said that Lord Agni ordered Videgha Mathava to establish the new kingdom of "Videha" amongst the "Easterners". Lord Agni burned away the vegetation on the other side of the river Sadanira, so that the tribe could settle there. In later times, the Sadanira formed the boundary between the kingdoms of Videha and Koshala . He had taken his tribe to the plains of the Ganges which had dense vegetation in the east. This is the Theory of Aryanisation  of Videha Kingdom in the eastern India.

References

Mithila
Indian monarchs
History of India